Vasily Mikhailovich Tarasyuk (also transliterated as Vasily Mikhailovich Tarasuk; October 10, 1948 – May 6, 2017) was a member of the State Duma of Russia. He was a member of the LDPR, and was Deputy Chairman of the State Duma's Committee on Natural Resources and Utilization. He previously served as chairman of a petroleum company. He drowned in the Dead Sea while on vacation in Israel.

References

1948 births
2017 deaths
People from Chernivtsi Oblast
Kyiv National University of Trade and Economics alumni
Liberal Democratic Party of Russia politicians
Recipients of the Order of Honour (Russia)
Recipients of the Medal of the Order "For Merit to the Fatherland" II class
Fourth convocation members of the State Duma (Russian Federation)
Fifth convocation members of the State Duma (Russian Federation)
Sixth convocation members of the State Duma (Russian Federation)
Seventh convocation members of the State Duma (Russian Federation)